Mecynorhina harrisi  is a species of beetles belonging to the family Scarabaeidae, subfamily Cetoniinae.

Subspecies
 Mecynorhina harrisi eximia (Aurivillius, 1886) 
 Mecynorhina harrisi eximioides (Allard, 1989) 
 Mecynorhina harrisi leptofurcata (Allard, 1985) 
 Mecynorhina harrisi peregrina (Kolbe, 1895) 
 Mecynorhina harrisi procera (Kolbe, 1884) 
 Mecynorhina harrisi schaueri (Schürhoff, 1933)

Description
Coloration and pattern of these beetles are very variable, depending on subspecies. Pronotum may be red-brown or greenish. Elytra may be greenish, bluish or dark brown, with white or yellow spots and markings. Males show large forward-projecting horns.

Distribution
This species can be found in Cameroon, Kenya, Tanzania and Uganda.

References
 De Palma (M.) & Frantz (S.), 2010. Taxonomic revision of Megalorhina Westwood and subgeneric classification of Mecynorhina Hope, Natura Edizioni Scientifiche
 Biolib

Cetoniinae
Beetles described in 1847